Bert Vermeir (born 3 March 1977) is a Belgium Paralympic equestrian. He won a bronze medal in the 2004 Summer Paralympics.

Biography
Vermeir was born in Merchtem and received a pony for his 4th birthday. However he was left paralysed in 1992 after an accident involving his pony, which led to several broken vertebrae. Vermeir's first international para-equestrian appearance was the World Cup Denmark in 1999. In 2000, he made his Paralympic debut in Sydney.

In 2004, Vermeir won Paralympic bronze in the Mixed Dressage - Freestyle Grade III riding Den Eik Heino.

External links
 Website

References

1977 births
Living people
Paralympic bronze medalists for Belgium
Equestrians at the 2000 Summer Paralympics
Equestrians at the 2004 Summer Paralympics
Equestrians at the 2008 Summer Paralympics
Medalists at the 2004 Summer Paralympics
Paralympic medalists in equestrian
Paralympic equestrians of Belgium